Human Vaccines & Immunotherapeutics is a monthly peer-reviewed medical journal covering research into vaccines and immunotherapeutics in humans. It was established in 2005 as Human Vaccines, and obtained its current name in 2012. It is published by Taylor & Francis and the editor-in-chief is Ronald Ellis (FutuRx). According to the Journal Citation Reports, the journal had a 2013 impact factor of 3.643.

References

External links

Vaccinology journals
Taylor & Francis academic journals
Monthly journals
Publications established in 2005
English-language journals